Batrachedra is the largest genus in the moth family Batrachedridae, with representatives all over the world. The early stages of most species are unknown. The genus name is derived from the Greek words batrachos, 'frog', and edra, 'seat', referring to the frog-like resting posture of the adult moths. As of 2018 at least some 114 species are known to belong to the genus.

Distribution
There are only three species found in Europe. There is an especially high amount of biodiversity in the Indomalayan realm.

Ecology
Of most species little is known about the ecology, but of those of which it is known, the caterpillars across the genus use a large variety of host plants. At least two mine within pine or spruce needles, one is found respectively on Cyperaceae, Juncaceae, Salix and Populus, one is a pest of pineapples, another a pest of Agave, one feeds on the fruit of Smilax china and another on types of palms from Brazil.

Species
The genus contains the following species:

Batrachedra acrodeta Meyrick, 1927 (from Samoa)
Batrachedra agaura Meyrick, 1901 (from New Zealand)
Batrachedra albicapitella Sinev, 1986 (from the Koreas, Japan, south of far eastern Siberia)
Batrachedra amydraula Meyrick, 1916 (from India, UAE)
Batrachedra angusta Turati, 1930 (from northernmost Africa)
Batrachedra aphypnota (Meyrick, 1917) (from Sri Lanka)
Batrachedra arenosella (Walker, 1864) (widespread, New Zealand, Australia, etc.)
Batrachedra astathma Meyrick, 1897 (from Australia)
Batrachedra astricta Philpott, 1930 (from New Zealand)
Batrachedra atomosella Walsingham, 1900 (from Socotra)
Batrachedra atriloqua Meyrick, 1931 (from Fiji)
Batrachedra auricomella Sinev, 1993 (from Primorsky Krai)
Batrachedra busiris Hodges, 1966 (from Florida in the USA)
Batrachedra calator Hodges, 1966 (from Mexico)
Batrachedra capnospila Lower, 1899 (from New South Wales in Australia)
Batrachedra chasanella Sinev, 1993 (from Primorsky Krai)
Batrachedra comosae Hodges, 1966 (from Puerto Rico)
Batrachedra concitata Meyrick, 1928 (from Texas, New Mexico)
Batrachedra conspersa Meyrick, 1916 (from Ecuador)
Batrachedra copia Clarke, 1957 (from Mexico)
Batrachedra daduchus Hodges, 1966 (from Jamaica)
Batrachedra decoctor Hodges, 1966 (from Florida and Bermuda)
Batrachedra diplosema Meyrick, 1897 (from Queensland in Australia)
Batrachedra ditrota Meyrick, 1897 (from Australia)
Batrachedra dolichoscia Meyrick, 1928 (Neotropical)
Batrachedra elucus  Hodges, 1966 (Arizona)
Batrachedra enormis Meyrick, 1928 (Neotropical)
Batrachedra epimyxa Meyrick, 1916 (India)
Batrachedra epixantha Meyrick, 1917 (from Australia)
Batrachedra epombra Meyrick, 1914 (from Africa)
Batrachedra eremochtha  (from Australia)
Batrachedra eucola Meyrick, 1889 (New Zealand)
Batrachedra eurema Bradley, 1956 (from Guadalcanal, Lord Howe Island)
Batrachedra eustola Meyrick, 1889 (Australia)
Batrachedra filicicola Meyrick, 1917 (New Zealand)
Batrachedra folia Hodges, 1966 (Arizona)
Batrachedra garritor Hodges, 1966 (Arizona)
Batrachedra granosa Meyrick, 1911 (from Namibia, South Africa)
Batrachedra hageter Hodges, 1966 (California)
Batrachedra helarcha  (from Australia)
Batrachedra heliota Meyrick, 1913 (from South Africa)
Batrachedra holochlora  (from Australia)
Batrachedra hypachroa  (from Australia)
Batrachedra hypoleuca 
Batrachedra hypoxutha 
Batrachedra illusor 
Batrachedra isochtha Meyrick, 1914 (from Congo, Uganda, South Africa)
Batrachedra knabi  (Walsingham, 1909) (Neotropical)
Batrachedra leucophyta  (from Australia)
Batrachedra libator 
Batrachedra linaria 
Batrachedra liopsis  (from Australia)
Batrachedra litterata 
Batrachedra lygropis  (from Australia)
Batrachedra macroloncha 
Batrachedra mathesoni 
Batrachedra meator Hodges, 1966 (Neotropical)
Batrachedra megalodoxa  (from Australia)
Batrachedra metaxias  (from Australia)
Batrachedra microbias Meyrick, 1914 (from South Africa)
Batrachedra microdryas  (from Australia)
Batrachedra microtoma  (from Australia)
Batrachedra mictopsamma 
Batrachedra monophthalma 
Batrachedra mylephata  (from Australia)
Batrachedra myrmecophila 
Batrachedra notocapna  (from Australia)
Batrachedra nuciferae Hodges, 1966 (Neotropical)
Batrachedra ochricomella Sinev, 1993 (Russia)
Batrachedra oemias Meyrick, 1909 (from South Africa)
Batrachedra orinarcha Meyrick, 1917 (India)
Batrachedra pacabilis Meyrick, 1922
Batrachedra pachybela Meyrick, 1934 (from Sudan)
Batrachedra paritor Hodges, 1966 (Neotropical)
Batrachedra parvulipunctella Chrétien, 1915 (from Europe)
Batrachedra pastor Meyrick, 1936 (Taiwan)
Batrachedra peroptusa  Meyrick, 1922  (Neotropical)
Batrachedra phaneropa Meyrick, 1914 (from Malawi)
Batrachedra phorcydia  (from Australia)
Batrachedra pinicolella  (Zeller, 1839) (from Europe, Palearctic)
Batrachedra plagiocentra  (from Australia)
Batrachedra praeangusta (Haworth, 1828) (from Europe, Palearctic)
Batrachedra promylaea Meyrick, 1917 (India)
Batrachedra psithyra Meyrick, 1922 (New Zealand)
Batrachedra rainha Bippus, 2020
Batrachedra repertor Hodges, 1966 (Neotropical)
Batrachedra rhysodes 
Batrachedra rixator Hodges, 1966 (Neotropical)
Batrachedra sacrata Meyrick, 1921 (India)
Batrachedra salicipomenella 
Batrachedra salina Meyrick, 1921 (from Australia)
Batrachedra satirica Meyrick, 1917 (from Australia)
Batrachedra saurota Meyrick, 1911 (from South Africa)
Batrachedra scapulata Meyrick, 1917 (Sri Lanka)
Batrachedra scitator 
Batrachedra siliginea  (from Australia)
Batrachedra smilacis Sugisima, 2006
Batrachedra stenosema Lower, 1904
Batrachedra sterilis Meyrick, 1897 (from Australia)
Batrachedra striolata 
Batrachedra subglauca Sinev, 1979 (Russia)
Batrachedra substrata Meyrick, 1916 (Sri Lanka)
Batrachedra tarsimaculata Walsingham, 1897 (West Indies)
Batrachedra testor Hodges, 1966 (Florida)
Batrachedra theca Clarke, 1957 (Neotropical)
Batrachedra trimeris Meyrick, 1897 (from Australia)
Batrachedra tristicta Meyrick, 1901 (New Zealand)
Batrachedra velox Meyrick, 1897 (from Australia)
Batrachedra verax Meyrick, 1917 (Sri Lanka)
Batrachedra volucris  (from Australia)
Batrachedra xanthocrena Meyrick, 1917 (India)
Batrachedra zenochroa Lower, 1904 (from Australia)

Selected former species

Batrachedra albanica 
Batrachedra albistrigella
Batrachedra bedelliella
Batrachedra bermudensis
Batrachedra clemensella
Batrachedra concors
Batrachedra crypsineura
Batrachedra cuniculata
Batrachedra curvilineella
Batrachedra ephelus
Batrachedra halans
Batrachedra hologramma
Batrachedra kabulella
Batrachedra ledereriella (Zeller, 1850) (from southern Europe, Canary Islands, Morocco)
Batrachedra lomentella
Batrachedra microstigma
Batrachedra peroptusa Meyrick, 1922 (Neotropical)
Batrachedra phragmitidella
Batrachedra praeangustella
Batrachedra psilopa
Batrachedra pulvella
Batrachedra ruficiliata
Batrachedra silvatica
Batrachedra sophroniella
Batrachedra stegodyphobius
Batrachedra supercincta
Batrachedra turdipennella
Batrachedra unifasciella

References

External links

De Prins, J. & De Prins, W. 2016. Afromoths, online database of Afrotropical moth species (Lepidoptera). World Wide Web electronic publication (www.afromoths.net) (acc.23-Aug-2016) 
Lee & Brown, 2009. Revised Checklist of Batrachedridae in Neotropical Region. - http://mississippientomologicalmuseum.org.msstate.edu/ 
Butterflyhouse.com.au 

Batrachedridae